The British Independent Film Award for Best Make-Up & Hair Design is an annual award given by the British Independent Film Awards (BIFA) to recognize the best make-up and hair design in a British independent film. The award was first presented in the 2017 ceremony.

Prior to 2017, make-up was included in the category Best Technical Achievement alongside different areas of crafts in film, this category was presented from 2001 to 2016.

Winners and nominees

2000s
 Best Technical Achievement

2010s
 Best Technical Achievement

Best

2020s

References

External links
 Official website

British Independent Film Awards